Joseph Ellis Johnson (December 19, 1785 – February 27, 1877) was a farmer, businessman, and politician who served as United States Representative and became the 32nd Governor of Virginia from 1852 to 1856, the first Virginia governor to be popularly elected as well as the only Virginia governor from west of the Appalachian mountains. During the American Civil War, he sympathized with the Confederacy, but returned to what had become West Virginia for his final years.

Early life and family
Born in Orange County, New York, Johnson moved with his widowed mother Abigail Wright Johnson (1753-1839) and four siblings to Belvidere, New Jersey in 1791 and then to Winchester, Virginia (possibly after a long detour to Suffolk, Virginia) before moving across the Appalachian Mountains to Bridgeport in what became Harrison County, Virginia (and then West Virginia) in 1801.

The sixteen-year-old Johnson soon got a job helping Ephraim Smith, a local gentleman farmer suffering from ill health, and came to manage Smith's land. Three years later, on May 14, 1804, he married one of his employer's daughters, Sarah Smith (1784-1853). At least five of their children died before the age of 11. However, their son Dr. Benjamin Franklin Johnson (1816-1855) and daughter Catherine Selina Minor (1824-1900) survived and married, although both moved from the area (to Franklin County, Ohio, and Baltimore, respectively).

Career

By 1807, in addition to farming, Johnson rebuilt the Smith mill (built circa 1803) on Simpson Creek, which he bought from Smith's widow and heirs. In 1811, the Harrison county government ordered a bridge built about a quarter mile above "Johnson's Mill", the first bridge built in Harrison county outside Clarksburg.
Johnson initially became active in local politics as a member of the Democratic-Republican Party (aligned with President Thomas Jefferson). He became the local constable in 1811 and formed one of two or three companies of "Harrison riflemen" that fought the War of 1812. In 1814, Captain Johnson and Captain John McWhorter of the other company led their riflemen to Norfolk, where Johnson and his men helped keep the peace until the war's end in 1815, while McWhorter's men headed west under General (and future President) William H. Harrison to fight in Ohio. Johnson's men were first assigned to the Sixth Regiment of Virginia militia, then to the Fourth Regiment.

When Johnson returned to Harrison County, voters elected him to represent them in the Virginia House of Delegates, defeating John Prunty, who had represented them for 22 years. One of Johnson's first acts was introducing legislation organizing the town of Bridgeport on 15 acres of his land. That passed on January 15, 1816; Johnson became one of the seven original trustees. He was reelected to the House of Delegates in 1816 and elected and reelected again in 1818-1822, after which he decided not to run again. Johnson would build a mansion in Bridgeport, the Governor Joseph Johnson House.
At the urging of Judge John G. Jackson ran against prominent orator and Congressman Philip Doddridge, Johnson ran for Congress and upset the incumbent. He served in the Eighteenth and Nineteenth Congresses (March 4, 1823 – March 3, 1825, and became chair of the Committee on Expenditures on Public Buildings in the Nineteenth Congress. He lost his reelection campaign in 1826 to the Twentieth Congress, but voters elected him to the Twenty-second Congress to fill the vacancy caused by the death of Doddridge, so he again served from January 21 to March 3, 1833. Johnson did not run for renomination in 1832. During this period, Congress built and maintained the National Road westward from Cumberland, Maryland; Johnson sat on the Cumberland Road committee. A key question became where the road would cross the Ohio River. Although Wheeling became the crossing point, others had advocated Parkersburg as the crossing point, following what would later become the Northwestern Turnpike (now U.S. Route 50) through Romney and Clarksburg to Parkersburg. Part of the compromise that allowed the Wheeling route was the construction of a road between Wheeling and Romney.

Johnson again ran for Congress as a Jacksonian in 1834, won the seat in the Twenty-fourth Congress, and was reelected (as a Democrat) to the Twenty-fifth and Twenty-sixth Congresses (March 4, 1835 – March 3, 1841). Johnson became chair of the Committee on Accounts in the Twenty-fifth and Twenty-sixth Congresses. He declined to be a candidate for renomination in 1840 but was a delegate to the Democratic National Convention in 1844. Johnson was elected to the Twenty-ninth Congress (March 4, 1845 - March 3, 1847) and became chair of the Committee on Revolutionary Claims (Twenty-ninth Congress). He again declined to run for renomination in 1846.
In 1847, Johnson again ran for election to the Virginia House of Delegates and was reelected the following year, again serving part-time while pursuing his farming and other business interests. During the  Virginia Constitutional Convention of 1850 and 1851, Johnson was one of the four delegates from the transmontane district of Wood, Ritchie, Harrison, Doddridge, Tyler, and Wetzel Counties, alongside John F. Snodgrass, Gideon D. Camden and Peter G. Van Winkle. As the convention's eldest delegate, Johnson called the convention to order and chaired the suffrage committee, where he fought for universal adult white male suffrage and against a poll tax.

The General Assembly elected Johnson Governor of Virginia in 1851, shortly before the new state constitution made the office elective by voters. Johnson thus served a short term, and became the Democratic Party's candidate in September 1851, then won reelection by defeating the Whig candidate (also from west of the Appalachians), George W. Summers. The only Virginia governor from west of the Allegheny Mountains entered upon the duties of the office under the new constitution on January 1, 1852. He served four years before returning to his Bridgeport home, although he also became a widower while in office.

American Civil War
Johnson had been a Democratic presidential elector in 1860 and personally disfavored secession. However, during Virginia's secession crisis in 1861, Johnson joined in the Confederate States' declared secession, became an elector for Jefferson Davis as the Confederate President, and ultimately moved to Staunton for the war's duration when U.S. Army soldiers occupied Bridgeport. Pro-Union men held a mass meeting in Clarksburg on April 22, 1861, to hear an address by John S. Carlile, and another on May 3, 1861, to hear an address by Francis H. Pierpont. However, Johnson countered by chairing another meeting on April 26 of "Southern Rights" men, including W.P. Cooper, Norval Lewis, and W. F. Gordon.

Final years, death and legacy

In 1866, Johnson, who had returned to Bridgeport, formally joined the Simpson Creek Baptist Church, whose churchyard his wife had been buried 13 years before. He died at his home, Oakdale, in Bridgeport, West Virginia, in 1877 and was buried beside his wife and young children in the old Brick Church Cemetery.

In 1941, it became known as the Bridgeport Cemetery, as various political and religious figures consolidated the Simpson Creek Baptist Cemetery with the adjoining Odd Fellows Lodge cemetery and the Masonic Lodge Cemetery. Meanwhile, Bridgeport had been formally incorporated in 1887, a decade after Johnson's death. Several locations in Bridgeport, West Virginia honor Johnson, including Johnson Avenue, Johnson Elementary School, and his former home, the Governor Joseph Johnson House.

The Library of Virginia maintains his executive papers. His nephew Waldo P. Johnson became a U.S. Senator representing Missouri.

Electoral history

1851; Johnson was elected Governor of Virginia with 53% of the vote, defeating Whig George W. Summers.

References

1785 births
1877 deaths
Farmers from West Virginia
Military personnel from West Virginia
Democratic Party governors of Virginia
Democratic Party members of the Virginia House of Delegates
People from Belvidere, New Jersey
People from Bridgeport, West Virginia
People from Orange County, New York
People from West Virginia in the War of 1812
Virginia Democratic-Republicans
Democratic-Republican Party members of the United States House of Representatives
Jacksonian members of the United States House of Representatives from Virginia
Democratic Party members of the United States House of Representatives from Virginia
19th-century American politicians
People of Virginia in the American Civil War
Trustees of populated places in Virginia